Max Thedy (16 October 1858, Munich - 13 August 1924, Polling) was a German painter, designer and engraver. He is sometimes erroneously referred to as Marc Thedy.

Biography 
He was the youngest of twelve children born to Johann Valentin Thedy, a Verwaltungsaktuar (administrative assistant in the community government) and his wife, Theresia. After his parents' premature deaths, he was taken in by the family of the Hamburg painter, Georg Friedrich Louis Reinhardt (1819–1905) and encouraged to pursue a career in  art.

After 1875, he was a student at the Academy of Fine Arts, Munich. In 1882, aged only twenty-four, he was called to be a Professor at the Grand-Ducal Saxon Art School, Weimar. In 1919, he became an instructor at the Bauhaus and, in 1921, was named a Professor there.

His works have been shown throughout Europe and the United States; most recently at exhibitions in Weimar (2002), Überlingen and Frankfurt am Main (2005).

References

Further reading 
 Peter Stapf: Der Maler Max Thedy (1858–1924). Leben und Werk. Böhlau, Köln 2014, . Substantial preview @ Google Books
 Siegfried Herrmann (Ed.): Max Thedy 1858–1924. Gemälde und Zeichnungen. Stadtmuseum, Weimar 2002,  (Exhibition catalog) Stadtmuseum Weimar
 Volker Caesar: "Überlingens letzte Renaissancefenster als Motive der Malerei des späten 19. Jahrhunderts. Gemälde von Max Thedy dokumentieren seltene Fenster." In: Denkmalpflege in Baden-Württemberg, 36. 2007, pgs. 55–61 (Online)

External links 

 More works by Thedy @ ArtNet

1858 births
1924 deaths
19th-century German painters
19th-century German male artists
German genre painters
German portrait painters
German engravers
20th-century German painters
20th-century German male artists